The Yarmouth Bloaters were a motorcycle speedway team who operated from Yarmouth Stadium, Great Yarmouth from 1948 to 1962.

History
Speedway meetings had been taking place at Yarmouth Stadium since 1932. In 1948 the Yarmouth Bloaters speedway team were created and they joined the National League Division Three. The original plan was to use the name Yarmouth Mariners but the name was disliked by supporters and the name Bloaters was chosen because of the town's connections with the fishing industry. It was also the nickname of the local football team, Great Yarmouth Town F.C. The team's race jacket consisted of red and black quarters which then became red with black cross adorned with an image of a silver bloater. The team finished in 11th place in their inaugural league season.

In 1949 the Bloaters finished joint top of Division Three with the Hanley Potters, but the Potters superior race points average meant that Yarmouth finished as runners up. Yarmouth were offered promotion and moved up to the National League Division Two for the 1950 season. They spent fours seasons in Division two, with the last in 1953 being the best as the team finished in third place.

Yarmouth wanted to open the 1954 season several weeks late but this wish was denied by the Speedway Control Board and the Bloaters were not issued a racing licence for that year. The track remained closed until a consortium of local businessmen took over in 1957.

Yarmouth continued with a number of open meetings and minor local speedway leagues until becoming one of the founder members of the Provincial League in 1960. During the season the club lost money after several home meetings were cancelled due to bad weather, and they finished seventh out of ten teams. The decision was taken not to enter the Provincial League for the 1961 season by the promoters and after taking part in several open meetings the Bloaters closed due to financial problems. The stadium now hosts greyhound and stock car racing, and the speedway track has been covered over with tarmac.

Season summary

References 

Defunct British speedway teams
Sport in Great Yarmouth
1948 establishments in England
1962 disestablishments in England